Dilmurod Nazarov  is a former Uzbekistani football midfielder who played for Uzbekistan.

Career
He started played professionally from 1992 in Pakhtakor. In 1992–1994, 1995–1998 and 2000 played for Pakhtakor. He won with Pakhtakor several  Oliy League champion titles and Uzbek Cups. In 1995, he was named by UFF after journalist's survey one of the 3 players for award Uzbekistan Footballer of the Year. He ranked 2nd after Oleg Shatskikh.

After 1998 he played mostly for Kazakhstani clubs in Kazakhstan Premier League. In 2006, he moved back to Oliy League club Navbahor Namangan after playing for Ordabasy.

International
He capped totally 10 matches for Uzbekistan national team. Nazarov played in the 1996 Asian Cup.

Honours

Club
Pakhtakor
Uzbek League (2): 1992, 1998
Uzbek Cup (2): 1993, 1997

Individual
Uzbekistan Footballer of the Year 2nd: 1995

External links

Expatriate footballers in Kazakhstan
Uzbekistani expatriate sportspeople in Kazakhstan
Uzbekistani expatriate footballers
Uzbekistani footballers
Living people
1976 births
Sportspeople from Tashkent
Association football midfielders
Pakhtakor Tashkent FK players
Uzbekistan international footballers